Propoliopsis is a genus of lichenized fungi in the family Stictidaceae. This is a monotypic genus, containing the single species Propoliopsis arengae.

References

Ostropales
Lichen genera
Ostropales genera